I Don't Dance may refer to:
"I Don't Dance" (High School Musical song), from High School Musical 2
 "I Don't Dance" by Birds in Row from We Already Lost the World
"I Don't Dance" by DMX from Undisputed
 I Don't Dance (album), by Lee Brice
 "I Don't Dance" (Lee Brice song), its title track
 "I Don't Dance (Without You)", a song by Matoma and Enrique Iglesias

See also
 "I Won't Dance", a jazz standard song